Earl Baker Ruth (February 7, 1916 – August 15, 1989) was a three-term U.S. Representative from North Carolina and subsequently served as governor of American Samoa.

Born in Spencer, North Carolina, Ruth graduated from Central High School in Charlotte, North Carolina in 1934. He earned an B.A. at the University of North Carolina in Chapel Hill, North Carolina in 1938 and a M.A. from the same institution in 1942. He completed his graduate-level education with a Ph.D. from the school in 1955.  He was a teacher and coach at Chapel Hill High School, 1938–40. Chapel Hill, North Carolina In 1933 Ruth was the North Carolina High School tennis champion (singles).  While at UNC, Chapel Hill Ruth was a basketball standout, serving as captain of the Tar Heel team in both his Junior and Senior years (1936–37 and 1937–38).

He subsequently served in the United States Navy. Ruth was head basketball coach and director of athletics at Catawba College in Salisbury, North Carolina from 1946 to 1960. From 1960 to 1968 he served as the Dean of Students there. He was member of Salisbury City Council from 1963 to 1968,  serving as mayor pro tempore from 1967 to 1968.

Ruth was elected as a Republican to the Ninety-first and to the two succeeding Congresses (January 3, 1969 – January 3, 1975).  He was an unsuccessful candidate for re-election to the Ninety-fourth Congress in 1974.  He was then appointed by President of the United States Gerald R. Ford to be Governor of American Samoa from 1975 to 1976. During his period as Governor of American Samoa opposition to the practice of the federal government appointing governors grew stronger. Within eighteen months, Ruth had removed numerous Samoans in administrative posts, who had been appointed by former Governor John Morse Haydon. Ruth was soon recalled to Washington, DC, and was quoted for having called Samoans "lazy, thieving liars."

Personal life 
Ruth's wife was Jane Wylie Ruth. On August 15, 1989 Ruth died in Salisbury. He is interred in Salisbury National Cemetery.

Legacy 
In 2012, the North Carolina Department of Transportation named a section of U.S. 601 in Rowan County "Congressman Earl Ruth Highway" in his honor.

References

 

1916 births
1989 deaths
20th-century American educators
20th-century American politicians
American men's basketball players
United States Navy personnel of World War II
American Samoa Republicans
Basketball coaches from North Carolina
Basketball players from North Carolina
Catawba Indians athletic directors
Catawba Indians men's basketball coaches
Governors of American Samoa
Military personnel from North Carolina
North Carolina city council members
North Carolina Tar Heels men's basketball players
People from Salisbury, North Carolina
People from Spencer, North Carolina
Republican Party members of the United States House of Representatives from North Carolina
Schoolteachers from North Carolina
University of North Carolina at Chapel Hill alumni